Camden Historic District is a national historic district located at Camden, Kent County, Delaware.  It encompasses 65 contributing buildings in the crossroads community of Camden. At least 18 of the contributing buildings date between 1780 and 1820, with the remainder dated to the 19th century.  Notable buildings include the Greek Revival style "Spruce Acres", Georgian style Mifflin House, the 1856 Whatcoat Methodist Church, Amity Lodge Building, Gov. George Truitt House, and a number of Italianate style dwellings.

It was added to the National Register of Historic Places in 1974.

References

External links

Historic American Buildings Survey in Delaware
Georgian architecture in Delaware
Greek Revival architecture in Delaware
Italianate architecture in Delaware
Historic districts in Kent County, Delaware
Historic districts on the National Register of Historic Places in Delaware
National Register of Historic Places in Kent County, Delaware